Steven P. Scalet is associate professor for the Division of Legal, Ethical and Historical Studies at the Yale Gordon College of Arts and Sciences, University of Baltimore.

Early life 
Scalet gained his degree from the Franklin & Marshall College, he went on to the University of Arizona where he completed a master's degree in economics and, in 1999, his philosophy doctorate.

Academic career 
Scalet's teaching career began in 1999 when he became associate professor of philosophy and economics at Binghamton University, State University of New York (SUNY). As director of the Philosophy, Politics and Law (PPL), he helped to set up the PPL Institute which invites well known philosophers to the university's campus.

In 2009 Scalet took up his current position as associate professor for the Division of Legal, Ethical and Historical Studies at the Yale Gordon College of Arts and Sciences, University of Baltimore where he is also the director of interdisciplinary studies. He also delivers lectures for the New York Council for the Humanities on the subjects democracy and corporate responsibility.

Honors 
 2003-2004 State University of New York (SUNY) Chancellor's Award for excellence in teaching
 2007 Binghamton University Council/Foundation Award for commitment to the campus community

Personal life 
Scalet is married, to Debby, and they have a daughter, Sophia.

Selected bibliography

Books

Chapters in books

Journal articles

References

External links 
 Profile: Steven P. Scalet Yale Gordon College of Arts and Sciences, University of Baltimore
 Speakers in the Humanities New York Council for the Humanities

21st-century American philosophers
American ethicists
Binghamton University faculty
Franklin & Marshall College alumni
State University of New York faculty
University of Arizona alumni
University of Baltimore faculty
Year of birth missing (living people)
Living people